Özmert is a Turkish surname. Notable people with the surname include:

 Hakan Özmert (born 1985), French-Turkish footballer
 Semih Özmert (1921–2015), Turkish judge

Turkish-language surnames